Thomas Breivik (born 1 March 1977) is a retired Norwegian football defender.

He made his Eliteserien debut for FK Bodø/Glimt in October 1997 against Viking. After four more seasons where he was a semi-regular for the last three, he joined FK Lofoten in 2002. Ahead of the 2003 season he went on to Innstrandens IL, playing there until 2006. In 2003 he was named 3. divisjon Group 21 player of the year by Avisa Nordland.

References

1977 births
Living people
Sportspeople from Bodø
Norwegian footballers
FK Bodø/Glimt players
FK Lofoten players
Eliteserien players
Association football defenders